East Angus is a city in Le Haut-Saint-François Regional County Municipality, in Quebec, Canada. The city had a population of 3,741 as of the Canada 2011 Census.

Demographics 

References

External links

Incorporated places in Estrie
Cities and towns in Quebec
Le Haut-Saint-François Regional County Municipality
Canada geography articles needing translation from French Wikipedia